Anne Ingram may refer to:

 Anne Ingram, Viscountess Irvine (c.1696–1764), a British court official
 Anne Bower Ingram (1937–2010), an Australian author
 Anne Ingram (New Zealand writer), (born 1947) New Zealand children's author and radio producer